Carmen Mastren (born Carmine Nicholas Mastrandrea, October 6, 1913March 31, 1981) was an American jazz guitarist, banjoist, and violinist who was a member of the Tommy Dorsey orchestra from 1936–1941.

Career
Mastren became a professional musician in 1934 when he joined the Wingy Manone and Joe Marsala band. During the 1940s, he spent four years as a guitarist and arranger for Tommy Dorsey. After his time with Marsala, he was a studio musician, recorded with Sidney Bechet, then entered the U.S Army. He was a member of the Glenn Miller Air Force big band. From the early 1950s to 1970, he worked as a studio musician for NBC. He recorded one solo album, on which he played banjo instead of guitar.

During the 1940s Mastren worked as musical director and conductor for Morton Downey, and from 1954–1970 Mastren played for The Today Show, The Tonight Show and Say When!! on NBC. Mastren died at age 68 from a heart attack on March 31, 1981 at his home in Valley Stream on Long Island, New York.

Discography

As leader
 Banjorama (Mercury, 1958)

As sideman
 Al Caiola, Italian Guitars (Time 1960)
 The Four Lads, Dixieland Doin's (Kapp 1961)
 Bud Freeman, Midnight at Eddie Condon's (Emarcy, 1955)
 Wingy Manone, Trumpet On the Wing (Decca 1958)
 Tony Mottola, String Band Strum-Along (Command 1961)

References

External links
 Carmen Mastren recordings at the Discography of American Historical Recordings.

1913 births
1981 deaths
Jazz musicians from New York (state)
People from Cohoes, New York
20th-century American guitarists
20th-century American male musicians
American banjoists
American jazz guitarists
American jazz musicians
American male guitarists
American male jazz musicians